Nuctenea is a genus of orb-weaver spiders first described by Eugène Simon in 1895. Its most familiar member is the Walnut Orb-Weaver Spider, N. umbratica.

Species
 it contains only three species.
 Nuctenea cedrorum (Simon, 1929) — Algeria
 Nuctenea silvicultrix (C. L. Koch, 1835) — Palearctic
 Nuctenea umbratica (Clerck, 1757) —  Europe to Azerbaijan
 Nuctenea umbratica nigricans (Franganillo, 1909) — Portugal
 Nuctenea umbratica obscura (Franganillo, 1909) — Portugal

References

Araneidae
Araneomorphae genera
Spiders of Asia
Spiders of Africa
Taxa named by Eugène Simon